Ayatollah Abolghasem Wafi Yazdi, born in 1935, in Hoseynabad, Yazd, is a Shia cleric and member of the Assembly of Experts. He was also one of the representatives of the city of Yazd in the first and the second terms of the Islamic Consultative Assembly in Iran.

Education 
At the age of five, Wafi began to learn the Quran and then went to school and later to high school. Afterwards, he went to the seminary in Yazd and completed the preliminary courses as well as some courses of "Sath" (meaning level or surface). In 1957, he went to Qom to further his studies at "Sath". Then he went to Qom seminary to study Kharij courses.

Professors 
Abolghasem Wafi met with many different teacher during his academic years including:

 Sheikh Ali Panah Ishtihardi
Naser Makarem Shirazi
Hossein Noori Hamedani
 Tabatabai Soltani
 Hussein-Ali Montazeri
 Reza Sadr
 Hossein Kazemeyni Boroujerdi
 Morteza Haeri Yazdi
 Ruhollah Khomeini
 Mostafa Mohaghegh Damad

See also 

 List of Ayatollahs
 List of members in the Fourth Term of the Council of Experts
 List of members in the Fifth Term of the Council of Experts

References 

Members of the Assembly of Experts
Iranian Shia clerics
1935 births
Living people